Television Spy is a 1939 American drama film directed by Edward Dmytryk and starring William Henry.

Plot
A scientist invents a television called the Iconoscope, which thieves try to steal.

Cast
 William Henry as Douglas Cameron
 Judith Barrett as Gwen Lawson
 William Collier Sr. as James Llewellyn
 Richard Denning as Dick Randolph
 John Eldredge as Boris
 Dorothy Tree as Reni Vonich
 Anthony Quinn as Forbes
 Minor Watson as Burton Lawson
 Morgan Conway as Carl Venner
 Wolfgang Zilzer as Frome
 Chester Clute as Harry Payne
 Byron Foulger as William Sheldon
 Ottola Nesmith as Caroline Sheldon
 Hilda Plowright as Amelia Sheldon
 Olaf Hytten as Wagner, the Llewellyn butler
 Charles Lane as Adler, insurance salesman
 Eric Wilton as Edgar, Reni's Butler

References

External links
 

1939 films
1939 drama films
American drama films
American black-and-white films
Paramount Pictures films
Films directed by Edward Dmytryk
1930s English-language films
1930s American films